In mathematics the Markov theorem gives necessary and sufficient conditions for two braids to have closures that are equivalent knots or links. The conditions are stated in terms of the group structures on braids. 

Braids are algebraic objects described by diagrams; the relation to topology is given by Alexander's theorem which states that every knot or link in three-dimensional Euclidean space is the closure of a braid. The Markov theorem, proved by Russian mathematician Andrei Andreevich Markov Jr. describes the elementary moves generating the equivalence relation on braids given by the equivalence of their closures. 

More precisely Markov's theorem can be stated as follows: given two braids represented by elements  in the braid groups , their closures are equivalent links if and only if  can be obtained from applying to  a sequence of the following operations:
 the inverse of the previous operation (if  with  replace with ).

References

Theorems in algebraic topology